is a 2012 Japanese film directed by Nobuhiro Yamashita. It was released in Japan on July 14, 2012.

Cast
Mirai Moriyama as Kanta Kitamachi 
Kengo Kora as Shoji Kusakabe 
Atsuko Maeda as Yasuko Sakurai

References

External links
 

2012 films
Films based on Japanese novels
Films directed by Nobuhiro Yamashita
Films set in 1986
Films set in Japan
2010s Japanese films